Charles Williamson Flusser (September 27, 1832 – April 19, 1864) was an officer in the United States Navy during the American Civil War.

Biography
Born at Annapolis, Maryland, Flusser entered the United States Naval Academy in 1847 and graduated with the Class of 1853 with the rank of passed midshipman. He received promotion to master and then lieutenant on September 15 and 16, 1855, while serving in the South American Squadron. In early 1861, Flusser was appointed to the Naval Academy in Annapolis, and oversaw its relocation to Fort Adams in Newport, Rhode Island.

Flusser served on blockade duty off the coast of Georgia in late 1861, before being appointed commander of the gunboat  for the Burnside Expedition, taking part in the victory at the Battle of Elizabeth City in February 1862.

Flusser was promoted to lieutenant commander in July 1862, also assuming command of all Union gunboats in Albemarle Sound. He took part in the expedition against Franklin, Virginia, in October 1862, with his ship only narrowly escaping capture.

Flusser was killed in action on April 19, 1864, during the Battle of Plymouth, commanding the Union naval forces present. In that action, Flusser personally fired a cannon shell at the Confederate ironclad. The shell, with a 10-second fuse, bounced off the Albemarle's armor and landed back on the deck of the Miami, where its explosion killed him. Brigadier General Henry W. Wessells, commanding the garrison at Plymouth, North Carolina, noted: "In the death of this accomplished sailor the Navy has lost one of its brightest ornaments..."

Flusser was interred at the military cemetery in New Bern, but in 1868 his remains were transferred to the Naval Academy Cemetery.

Namesakes
Four United States Navy ships have been named  in his honor.

See also

References

 
Lieutenant Commander Charles W. Flusser at the U.S. Naval Historical Center

1832 births
1864 deaths
Union Navy officers
United States Naval Academy alumni
United States Navy officers
People of Maryland in the American Civil War
Union military personnel killed in the American Civil War
People from Annapolis, Maryland
Burials at the United States Naval Academy Cemetery